Blockade is a 1928 American silent drama film directed by George B. Seitz.

Cast
 Anna Q. Nilsson as Bess
 Wallace MacDonald as Vincent
 James Bradbury Sr. as Gwynn
 Walter McGrail as Hayden

References

External links

1928 films
Silent American drama films
American silent feature films
1928 drama films
Films directed by George B. Seitz
American black-and-white films
Film Booking Offices of America films
1920s American films
1920s English-language films